The Sardinian regional election of 2014 took place on 16 February 2014.

Francesco Pigliaru of the Democratic Party defeated incumbent Ugo Cappellacci of Forza Italia. The combined score of the highly fragmented Sardist parties was 26%.

The Five Star Movement did not take part to the election, after Beppe Grillo refused to concede the use of his party's symbol. 

The notorious novelist Michela Murgia, who received more than the 10% of votes, wasn't elected because of the new high electoral threshold.

New electoral system
In 2013 Sardinian electoral law was changed once again.

While the President of Sardinia and the first leader of the opposition are still elected at-large, 58 councillors, instead of 64 as it was before, are elected by party lists under a form of semi-proportional representation. The winning coalition receives a jackpot of additional seats, which are divided between all majority parties using the D'Hondt method, as it happens between the losing lists. Each party then distributes its seats to its provincial lists, where candidates are openly selected.

The electoral threshold is fixed at 10% for coalitions and 5% for single parties. No electoral threshold is fixed for those parties inside a coalition. The leader of the alliance which receives a plurality of votes and at least 25% of votes becomes the President of Sardinia.

Results

</onlyinclude>

References

2014 elections in Italy
Elections in Sardinia
February 2014 events in Italy